The 2016 Savannah Steam season was the third season for the indoor football franchise, and their second in American Indoor Football (AIF).

For 2016, the Steam announced that they would be playing at the Savannah Civic Center. The team would run into severe financial troubles during the season with over $20,000 owed in rent for the use of the Civic Center and several unpaid sponsors. Eventually, the unpaid sponsors took their claims to the local sheriff's department in order to initiate an investigation and obtain the fees they were owed.

Schedule
Key:

Exhibition
All start times are local to home team

Regular season
All start times are local to home team

* – The Steam actually lost this game 19-32, however, the AIF later determined the Vultures had used illegal players and reversed the score instead of a just calling it a forfeit.

Standings

Playoffs
All start times are local to home team

* — When initially announced, the Tarpons were set to play the Southern Division's third-seeded Myrtle Beach Freedom. On May 30, the Freedom replaced the Northern Division's fourth-seeded Central Penn Capitals against the West Michigan Ironmen. The Freedom's former position was replaced by the Southern Division's fourth-seed, the Savannah Steam.

Roster

References

Savannah Steam
Savannah Steam